The women's rugby sevens tournament at the 2019 Pacific Games was held in Lotopa, Samoa. It was hosted at the St Joseph's Sports Field from 12 to 13 July 2019. Fiji won the gold medal with a 19-5 victory over Australia in the final.

Participating nations
Eight teams with 12 players in each squad played in the tournament.

Pool stage

Pool A

Pool B

Knockout stage

Quarter-finals

5th-8th Semi-finals

Semi-finals

7th-place play-off

5th-place play-off

Bronze medal match

Gold medal match

See also
 Rugby sevens at the Pacific Games
 Rugby sevens at the 2019 Pacific Games – Men's tournament

References

Women